Siparuna vasqueziana is an evergreen dioecious shrub which grows to 5 m in height. It is found in primary forest habitats in Amazonian Peru. It can be distinguished from all other Siparuna species by its yellow flowers with exceptionally long tepals.

References

New species of Siparuna

Siparunaceae
Dioecious plants
Plants described in 2000